Melila  is a village in Kollam district in the state of Kerala, India situated along the Vettikkavala - Elampal road. The nearest NH, National Highway 744 (India) is at Kunnicode. The nearest Railway station is Auvaneeswaram railway station.  The region -- which is surrounded by dense rubber plantations -- has been used as a location for a number of Malayalam movies, including Mutharamkunnu P.O. and Kottaram Veettile Apputtan. There are also many well-known Television artistes from the region such as TV anchor and news reader Melila Sreekantan Nair of Asianet (TV channel).

The Hindu Melila temple is in Melila.

Demographics
 India census, Melila had a population of 22,529 with 10,770 males and 11,759 females.

References

Villages in Kollam district